The 2013 BRICS summit was the fifth annual BRICS summit, an international relations conference attended by the head of states or heads of government of the five member states Brazil, Russia, India, China and South Africa. The summit was held in Durban, South Africa in 2013. This completed the first round of BRICS summits.

Background
A declaration at the end of 2012 BRICS summit read that: "Brazil, Russia, India and China thank South Africa for the proposal to host the 5th summit in 2013. They intend to provide multifaceted support for it." The BRICS leaders are expected to discuss the establishment of a new development bank. According to Mikhail Margelov they will seek agreement on the amount of starting capital.

Participants
China's Xi Jingping made this the first summit of his presidency.

The heads of state/heads of government of the five countries that participated in the summit were:

Gallery of participating leaders
Members:

Discussions
The summit commenced on 26 March at 17:30 GMT. Amongst the important issues being discussed was the creation of the development bank as a follow up from the previous summit. It sought to create an infrastructure-focused bank. The disputes over the bank were in regards to what it would do and how it would provide an equitable return on the initial investment of about US$100bn.

Reactions
Host President Jacob Zuma said the summit could address South Africa's economic problems, such as high unemployment. He added: "BRICS provides an opportunity for South Africa to promote its competitiveness. It is an opportunity to move further in our drive to promote economic growth and confront the challenge of poverty, inequality and unemployment that afflicts our country. "

Daniel Twining of the German Marshall Fund said: "Ironically it may be the cleavages within the BRICS grouping that more accurately hint at the future of the global order: tensions between China and Brazil on trade, India on security, and Russia on status highlight the difficulty Beijing will have in staking its claim to global leadership." The media suggested the bank was way to bypass the IMF and the World Bank.
Despite high hopes for the 2013 summit, BRICS was not as involved as they had planned to be.

References

External links
Official site
The Sino-Brazilian Principles in a Latin American and BRICS Context: The Case for Comparative Public Budgeting Legal Research Wisconsin International Law Journal, 13 May 2015

05
2013 conferences
2013 in international relations
2013 in South Africa
21st-century diplomatic conferences (BRICS)
Diplomatic conferences in South Africa
History of Durban
March 2013 events in South Africa
Events in Durban